Willie Lee "Flipper" Anderson Jr. (born March 7, 1965) is an American former professional football player who was a wide receiver in the National Football League (NFL). He played for the Los Angeles Rams (1988–1994), the Indianapolis Colts (1995), the Washington Redskins (1996), and the Denver Broncos (1997). As a Bronco, he was part of their Super Bowl XXXII championship team over the Green Bay Packers. As a Ram, he set the NFL record for most receiving yards in a game with 336 against the Saints on November 26, 1989. (Anderson accumulated 40 of those yards in overtime).

Early life
Anderson was born in Philadelphia, Pennsylvania. He played high school football at Paulsboro High School in southern New Jersey and was one of the nation's top high school football recruits of the Class of 1983.

College career
Anderson played college football at UCLA where he was the main receiving target for quarterback Troy Aikman.

Professional career
Anderson was drafted by the Los Angeles Rams in the 2nd round (46th overall) of the 1988 NFL Draft.

Anderson played ten seasons in the NFL, and holds the National Football League record for most receiving yards and yards from scrimmage in a game, with 336 yards on 15 receptions with a 22.4 yards per reception average, set during the 12th week of the 1989 season against the New Orleans Saints. He finished the season with a career-high 1,146 yards off just 44 receptions, giving him an average of 26 yards per catch.  On January 7, 1990, during a divisional playoff game, the Rams won the coin toss after taking the New York Giants to overtime.  The Rams drove 77 yards in four plays, the last being a 30-yard touchdown pass to Anderson, who caught the ball in the end zone and ran directly through the tunnel and into the locker room. He caught two touchdown passes in that 19-13 win.

Anderson finished his career with 267 receptions for 5,357 yards and 28 touchdowns, giving him a 20.1 career yards per catch average.

Personal life
Anderson lives in Suwanee, Georgia and is a high school basketball referee. Anderson's son, Dres Anderson, played wide receiver for the Utah Utes.

References

External links
 

1965 births
Living people
American football wide receivers
Indianapolis Colts players
Los Angeles Rams players
UCLA Bruins football players
Washington Redskins players
Denver Broncos players
Paulsboro High School alumni
People from Paulsboro, New Jersey
Sportspeople from Gloucester County, New Jersey
Players of American football from New Jersey
Players of American football from Philadelphia